The 1876–77 international cricket season was from September 1876 to March 1877. This is the first ever international cricket season witnessed the first ever Test match between the hosts Australia and England. The series consisted with two timeless Test matches tied 1–1.

Englishman Alfred Shaw bowled the first Test delivery to Australian Charles Bannerman. Bannerman later became the first Test centurion in Test cricket history. Englishman Allen Hill had both the first Test wicket and the first catch. Billy Midwinter of Australia picked up the first 5 wicket haul in Test history whereas Australian Jack Blackham had the first stumping. James Southerton still holds the record for the oldest Test debutant at 49 years 119 days. Bannerman's score of 165 made 69.6% of his side's runs from the bat, still a record in Test matches.

Season overview

January

England in Australia

References

International cricket competitions by season
1876 in cricket
1877 in cricket